Stelpurnar okkar (English: Our girls) is an Icelandic documentary film about the Icelandic women's national football team's quest to be the first Icelandic national football team to advance to a major continental tournament. It was directed by Þóra Tómasdóttir and produced by Krumma Films and premiered in Háskólabíó on 14 August 2009.

The documentary was filmed during the team's games in the UEFA Women's Euro 2009 qualifying.

References

External links

Official site

2009 documentary films
2009 films
Icelandic documentary films
Documentary films about association football